Virginia's 30th House of Delegates district elects one of 100 seats in the Virginia House of Delegates, the lower house of the state's bicameral legislature. District 30 includes all of Orange County and Madison County and part of Culpeper County, Virginia. The district has been represented by Republican Nick Freitas since 2016. His predecessor was Republican Edward T. Scott.

District officeholders

Electoral history

References

External links
 

Virginia House of Delegates districts
Orange County, Virginia
Madison County, Virginia
Culpeper County, Virginia